Richard Lawrence Ottinger (born January 27, 1929) is an American legal educator and politician from New York. A Democrat, he served in the United States House of Representatives for eight terms, from 1965 to 1971 and from 1975 to 1985.

Early years
Richard Lawrence Ottinger was born in New York City, the son of businessman Lawrence Ottinger, founder of U.S. Plywood, and nephew of Albert Ottinger, the Republican Attorney General of New York from 1925 to 1928. He attended the public schools of Scarsdale, New York and graduated from the Loomis School, in Windsor, Connecticut in 1946. He received a bachelor of arts degree from Cornell University in 1950 and graduated from Harvard Law School in 1953. He also studied international law at Georgetown University. He served in the United States Air Force from 1955 to 1957, and was discharged as a captain. He was admitted to the New York bar and practiced international and corporate law. He was one of the founders and the second staff member of the Peace Corps, serving as director of programs for the west coast of South America from 1961 to 1964.

Political career

In the 1964 elections, he was elected as a Democrat to the 89th United States Congress and was re-elected twice in 1966 and 1968. After the 1964 run, Ottinger was criticized for using a loophole in election laws to spend $193,000 of his own money to get around a limit of $8,000 in the race. He set up multiple committees and gave money of all of them. Most prominently, Ottinger's mother, Louise, and sister, Patricia Heath, had set up 22 different committees that in turn donated $6,000 apiece to his campaign.

In the 1970 elections, he gave up his House seat to run on the Democratic ticket for United States Senator from New York. In the 1970 election, Ottinger split the liberal vote with the Republican (and Liberal-endorsed) nominee, incumbent Senator Charles Goodell (who was appointed by Governor Nelson Rockefeller after the assassination of Senator Robert F. Kennedy). Both were defeated by the nominee of the Conservative party, James L. Buckley in a three-way race.

In 1972, he sought to return to his old congressional seat, but lost in a hotly contested election to the Republican incumbent Representative Peter A. Peyser. His comeback effort was successful in 1974, when he was elected to the House from a different district. He was re-elected to the four succeeding Congresses (in 1976, 1978, 1980, and 1982), retiring in 1985. He bolstered his reputation as a leading legislator by founding the bipartisan Environmental Study Conference (ESC) in the House of Representatives in 1975, which grew to a membership of over 150 Members in less than a year.

Later life
After retiring from Congress, Ottinger became a professor at the Elisabeth Haub School of Law at Pace University, founding an environmental law program there, and served as the law school dean from 1994 to 1999. He currently serves as Dean Emeritus.

See also
 List of Jewish members of the United States Congress

Sources

External links
 OTTINGER profile in the Biographical Directory of the United States Congress

1929 births
American legal scholars
Cornell University alumni
Harvard Law School alumni
New York (state) lawyers
People from Scarsdale, New York
Military personnel from New York City
Jewish members of the United States House of Representatives
Living people
United States Air Force officers
Georgetown University Law Center alumni
Pace University faculty
Democratic Party members of the United States House of Representatives from New York (state)
21st-century American Jews
Loomis Chaffee School alumni